Hissing Prigs in Static Couture (stylised as H1551NG PR1G5 1N 5TAT1C COUTUR3) is the third and final studio album by American indie rock band Brainiac, released on March 26, 1996. It is the band's second release through Touch & Go Records, following the Internationale extended play released the year prior. The album incorporates more electronics than previous Brainiac releases, and hints towards the more synth-based electropunk style that the band would later focus on for their next extended play, and final release before Tim Taylor's death in 1997, Electro-Shock for President.

Background and recording
In an interview with Seconds magazine, Brainiac frontman Tim Taylor stated that the band was very interested in writing a "futuristic pop" album of sorts: "the idea was to make pop music that sounded futuristic so it wouldn’t sound dated." The band also incorporated a "70's fashion band" aesthetic around the time the album was in production, wearing gaudy outfits for their live performances.

The album was predominately recorded at Water Music in Hoboken, New Jersey, with production and engineering duties done by Eli Janney, who had also helped the band with their previous album Bonsai Superstar. "Nothing Ever Changes" was produced and recorded by Steve Albini in his basement. The entire album was mixed at Oz Recording in Baltimore, Maryland. A music video for the track "Vincent Come on Down" was produced to promote the album.

Reception

Hissing Prigs in Static Couture received much acclaim from critics and fans and is considered as one of the band's best recordings, alongside Bonsai Superstar. In a contemporary review of the album for CMJ New Music Monthly, Jenny Eliscu described Brainiac as "Saturday Night Fever gone punk". Retrospectively, Magnet described the album as a "lost classic", while Wondering Sounds Yancey Strickler referred to it as "the band's undisputed masterpiece".

Pitchfork ranked Hissing Prigs in Static Couture at number 73 on its list of the top 100 albums of the 1990s. It was also included in the site's list of the 25 best albums released through Touch & Go Records. NME included the album in its list of five albums with production by Steve Albini that they considered to be "essential", referring to Brainiac as "one of the most brain-bustingly unique [bands] the rock underground has ever seen".

Track listing
Notes

 All titles in all caps
 All I's, E's, S's and G's stylised as 1's 3's 5's and 9's, respectively.

Personnel

Brainiac
Tim Taylor – vocals, incidental
John Schmersal – guitar
Juan Monasterio – bass
Tyler Trent – drums

Production
Eli Janney – production, recording, engineering
Steve Albini – recording, production ("Nothing Ever Changes")
Jeff Gattens – assistance
Mike Rippe – assistance

References

External links

1996 albums
Brainiac (band) albums
Albums produced by Steve Albini
Touch and Go Records albums